Valea Mare is a commune located in Vâlcea County, Oltenia, Romania. It is composed of six villages: Bătășani, Delureni, Drăganu, Mărgineni, Pietroasa and Valea Mare.

References

Communes in Vâlcea County
Localities in Oltenia